Sören Mackeben (born 29 January 1979 in Hannover) is a German water polo player who was part of the Germany men's national water polo team. He competed in the 2004 Summer Olympics and in the 2008 Summer Olympics. He was also part of the  team at the World Championships, most recently at the 2007 and 2009 World Aquatics Championships.

References

1979 births
Living people
German male water polo players
Olympic water polo players of Germany
Water polo players at the 2004 Summer Olympics
Water polo players at the 2008 Summer Olympics
Sportspeople from Hanover